Spyridon Tetenes (1908 – 24 July 1977) was a Greek diplomat who was Foreign Minister after the coup d'état of November 25, 1973, by Brigadier General Dimitrios Ioannidis against the junta of George Papadopoulos. 

He resigned his post on July 8, 1974, ostensibly for health reasons though the New York Times reported the next day that "reliable sources" said his resignation was to protest Greece's worsening relations with Turkey and Cyprus as well as increasing military influence in foreign policy. He died in Geneva on 24 July 1977.

References 

1908 births
Leaders of the Greek junta
Diplomats from Athens
Foreign ministers of Greece
1977 deaths
Ambassadors of Greece to Yugoslavia